Mrs. Simpson may refer to:

 Wallis Simpson, who subsequently married the former King Edward VIII and became known as Her Grace the Duchess of Windsor
 Marge Simpson, a fictional character on the American television series The Simpsons